Hanefi may refer to:

People
 Mahmut Hanefi Erdoğdu, Turkish footballer
 Hanefi Mahçiçek, Turkish politician
 Rahmatullah Hanefi, Afghan activist

See also
 Hanefi, Osmancık
 Hanafi
 Kahramanmaraş Hanefi Mahçiçek Stadium

Turkish masculine given names